Eduardo Roberto dos Santos (born 2 February 1981 in Limeira), commonly known as Du Bala, is a Brazilian retired footballer who played as a forward.

Career
He signed with Belasitsa Petrich on 2 February 2006. For two years in Belasitsa Du Bala earned 34 appearances playing in the A PFG, scoring 15 goals.

In January 2008, Du Bala moved to Litex Lovech, with whom he won the 2008 Bulgarian Cup. One year later Du Bala signed with Slavia Sofia.

Awards
 Bulgarian Cup: 2008

References

External links
 Brazilian FA Database
 

Brazilian footballers
Brazilian expatriate footballers
PFC Belasitsa Petrich players
PFC Litex Lovech players
PFC Slavia Sofia players
FC Urartu players
Association football forwards
Sportspeople from Campinas
1981 births
Living people
Expatriate footballers in Bulgaria
Expatriate footballers in Armenia
Brazilian expatriate sportspeople in Bulgaria
First Professional Football League (Bulgaria) players
Armenian Premier League players